The Northwest Yeocomico River is a  tidal tributary of the Yeocomico River in the U.S. state of Virginia. The Yeocomico River system is a tidal branch of the Potomac River.

See also
List of rivers of Virginia

References

General references

USGS Hydrologic Unit Map - State of Virginia (1974)

Rivers of Virginia